BoardGameGeek (BGG) is an online forum for board gaming hobbyists and a game database that holds reviews, images and videos for over 125,600 different tabletop games, including European-style board games, wargames, and card games. In addition to the game database, the site allows users to rate games on a 1–10 scale and publishes a ranked list of board games.

.

History
BoardGameGeek was founded in January 2000 by Scott Alden and Derk Solko, and marked its 20th anniversary on 20 January 2020.

Since 2005, BoardGameGeek hosts an annual board game convention, BGG.CON, that has a focus on playing games, and where winners of the Golden Geek Awards are announced. New games are showcased and convention staff is provided to teach rules. There is also an annual Spring BGG.CON which is family friendly, and an annual BGG@Sea which is held on a cruise.

In 2010, BoardGameGeek received the Diana Jones Award, which recognized it as "a resource without peer for board and card gamers, the recognized authority of this online community." The New York Times has called BoardGameGeek "the hub of board gaming on the Internet."

In 2020, BoardGameGeek was inducted into the Origins Award Hall of Fame.

The site has branched out into other fields by using the same system for RPGs and video games (rpggeek.com and videogamegeek.com).

Golden Geek Award 

Since 2006, the site annually awards the best new board games of the year with the Golden Geek Award. Winners are selected based on a vote by registered users.

2006–2009

2010–2019 

RPG and Video Game awards
RPG and Video game awards were introduced in 2014 and awarded through 2017. Only 1 category was awarded in 2018, and none in following years.

2020–present 
2020 saw many awards replaced with new categories, such as "Board Game of the Year" replaced with "Game of the Year, Light", "Medium" and "Heavy".

See also
Going Cardboard (documentary)

References

External links
 

Board game websites
Online game databases
American review websites
Internet properties established in 2000